The 1932 United States presidential election in South Carolina took place on November 8, 1932, as part of the 1932 United States presidential election which was held throughout all contemporary 48 states. Voters chose 8 representatives, or electors to the Electoral College, who voted for president and vice president. 

South Carolina voted for the Democratic nominee, Governor Franklin D. Roosevelt of New York, over the Republican nominee, incumbent President Herbert Hoover of California. Roosevelt ran with incumbent Speaker of the House John Nance Garner of Texas, while Hoover's running mate was incumbent Vice President Charles Curtis of Kansas.

Roosevelt won South Carolina almost unanimously, taking 98.03% of the vote to Hoover's 1.89%. He swept every county in the state with more than 80% of the vote, and all but one with greater than 90%. With a victory margin of 96.14%, South Carolina proved to be Roosevelt's strongest state in this election.

Results

References

South Carolina
1932
1932 South Carolina elections